Emamzadeh Reza may refer to:
 Emamzadeh Reza, Mazandaran